FCIM may refer to:

Football Club Internazionale Milano
Fusible core injection molding
Fellow of The Chartered Institute of Marketing